Constellations: An International Journal of Critical and Democratic Theory is a quarterly peer-reviewed academic journal of critical and democratic theory and successor of Praxis International. It is currently edited by Jean L. Cohen, Cory Pope, and Hubertus Buchstein. Ertug Tombus is the managing editor of the journal since 2010. Seyla Benhabib, Nancy Fraser and Andrew Arato are the co-founding former editors. With an international editorial contribution, it is based at the New School in New York. 

Nadia Urbinati, Amy Allen, and Andreas Kalyvas are former co-editors.

References

External links
 

Sociology journals
Publications established in 1994
Quarterly journals
Wiley-Blackwell academic journals
English-language journals